Melittia bombyliformis is a moth of the family Sesiidae first described by Pieter Cramer in 1782. It is found in India and Sri Lanka.

References

Moths of Asia
Moths described in 1782